Erica Yohn (October 1, 1928 – January 27, 2019) was an American stage and television actress.

Yohn had many bit parts in film and television, such as Pee-wee's Big Adventure, and television shows, such as Rhoda,  ER, Murphy Brown, Double Rush, and Picket Fences. She voiced Mama Mousekewitz in An American Tail and its first two sequels.

From 1971 to 1972, she was a member of the Broadway cast of Lenny, playing various roles, including Sadie Kitchenberg alias Sally Marr, the mother of Lenny Bruce, directed by Tom O'Horgan. She also appeared on Broadway in the original play That Summer - That Fall (1967), an English-language revival of Federico García Lorca's play Yerma (1966–67), the musical Cabaret (1966–69), and revivals of such classics as The Alchemist (1966) and The Country Wife (1965–66).

Personal life and death
Yohn was born Adella (later known as "Adele") Erica Fishman, the younger child of Jacob and Sonia Fishman; she had an elder brother, Marcus. Yohn was married at least two times. She had two sons, one from her first marriage to Lars Speyer, David Speyer, and Yohn Rosqui, from her final marriage, to fellow actor Tom Rosqui in 1963.

Yohn died on January 27, 2019, aged 90, at her North Hollywood, California home after a sudden illness. Yohn Rosqui announced his mother's death on Facebook.

Partial filmography

References

External links

1928 births
2019 deaths
American stage actresses
American television actresses
American voice actresses
Actresses from New York City
People from the Bronx
21st-century American women